Torbalı railway station is the larger and busier of the two railway stations in the town of Torbalı, Turkey.

Torbalı has three platforms (2 island platforms, 1 side platform) servicing TCDD regional trains as well as IZBAN commuter trains.

Just south of the station is Torbalı junction, where the Torbalı-Ödemiş railway splits off the Izmir-Eğirdir railway.

Connections
Torbalı is serviced by several bus services that operate to neighboring towns and villages. The stop is located besides Haluk Alpsü Boulevard.

Gallery

References

Railway stations in İzmir Province
Railway stations opened in 1866
1866 establishments in the Ottoman Empire
Torbalı District